The Men's Finn was a sailing event on the Sailing at the 2012 Summer Olympics program in Weymouth and Portland National Sailing Academy. Eleven races (last one a medal race) were scheduled and completed. 24 sailors, on 24 boats, from 24 nations competed. Ten boats qualified for the medal race on course area Nothe in front of Weymouth, where each position scored double points.

Summary

Ben Ainslie took his fifth consecutive sailing medal, and his fourth consecutive gold. However, there was a heavy battle with Jonas Høgh Christensen of Denmark that was only decided at the last mark of the medal race. Ainslie and Høgh Christensen finally had an equal number of points but Ainslie had a higher score in one of the races.

Dutchman Pieter-Jan Postma almost took the gold while Ainslie and Høgh Christensen were battling it out, but at the last buoy Postma hit the camera on the New Zealand boat and took a penalty lap, dropping him to 4th place.

Ainslie took over the position of Paul Elvstrøm as most successful Olympic sailor with one silver medal in 1996 (Laser) and fourth consecutive gold 2000 (Laser), 2004 (Finn), 2008 (Finn) and 2012 (Finn). Elvstrøm won the Firefly in 1948 and the Finn in 1952, 1956 and 1960.

Schedule

Course areas and course configurations  

For the Finn course areas Nothe, West, and South. The location (50° 36.18’ N 02° 25.98’ W) points to the center of the Nothe course area, the location (50° 37.18’ N 02° 23.55’ W) points to the center of the West course area and the location (50° 35.71’ N 02° 22.08’ W) points to the center of the South course area. The target time for the course was 60 minutes for the races and 30 minutes for the medal race. The race management could choose from many course configurations.

Results

Daily standings

Further reading

References 

Men's Finn
Finn competitions